Duke Huan may refer to these rulers from ancient China:

Duke Huan of Zheng (died 771 BC)
Duke Huan of Chen (died 707 BC)
Duke Huan of Lu (died 694 BC)
Duke Huan of Qi (died 643 BC)
Duke Huan of Qin (died 577 BC)
Duke Huan of Jin (died 369 BC?)
Duke Huan of Tian Qi (400–357 BC)

See also
King Huan of Zhou (died 697 BC)
Marquis Huan of Cai (died 695 BC)